Shinnecock Hills is a hamlet (and census-designated place) in Suffolk County, New York, United States. The population was 2,188 at the 2010 census. It is the home of a leading golf club, Shinnecock Hills Golf Club. Ownership of the area has been the subject of a 2005 lawsuit filed by the Shinnecock Indian Nation.

Shinnecock Hills is in the Town of Southampton.

Geography
Shinnecock Hills is located at  (40.888100, -72.461735), immediately east of the Shinnecock Canal.

Demographics

Demographics of the CDP
As of the census of 2000, there were 1,749 people, 502 households, and 313 families residing in the CDP. The population density was 842.9 per square mile (326.2/km2). There were 928 housing units at an average density of 447.3/sq mi (173.1/km2). The racial makeup of the CDP was 89.99% White, 4.23% African American, 0.97% Native American, 0.97% Asian, 2.17% from other races, and 1.66% from two or more races. Hispanic or Latino of any race were 10.41% of the population.

There were 502 households, out of which 24.1% had children under the age of 18 living with them, 52.8% were married couples living together, 6.8% had a female householder with no husband present, and 37.6% were non-families. 27.7% of all households were made up of individuals, and 14.5% had someone living alone who was 65 years of age or older. The average household size was 2.45 and the average family size was 3.00.

In the CDP, the population was spread out, with 13.8% under the age of 18, 34.0% from 18 to 24, 17.6% from 25 to 44, 20.5% from 45 to 64, and 14.1% who were 65 years of age or older. The median age was 28 years. For every 100 females, there were 82.8 males. For every 100 females age 18 and over, there were 78.8 males.

The median income for a household in the CDP was $72,500, and the median income for a family was $89,211. Males had a median income of $51,172 versus $32,500 for females. The per capita income for the CDP was $28,378. About 7.7% of families and 13.9% of the population were below the poverty line, including 19.7% of those under age 18 and 6.8% of those age 65 or over.

Land claim dispute
There is a question mark over ownership of the area of Shinnecock Hills, as it is claimed by the Shinnecock Indian Nation as their land that was seized in a white land grab in 1859.

The disputed property includes the Shinnecock Hills Golf Club, which Native American representatives say is the location of tribal burial grounds.

The core of the lawsuit is over a 1703 deal between Southampton and the tribe for a 1,000-year lease. The suit charges that a group of powerful investors conspired to break the lease in 1859 by sending the state legislature a fraudulent petition from a number of Shinnecock tribesmen. The town of Southampton is claimed to have spent over $732,000 in legal fees in relation to this lawsuit.

References

Census-designated places in New York (state)
Hamlets in New York (state)
Southampton (town), New York
Census-designated places in Suffolk County, New York
Hamlets in Suffolk County, New York
Populated coastal places in New York (state)